Jaypee- Health Science Publisher is a 55 year old company based out of India with a global foot print. It publishes books and journals in all sub specialties of health sciences catering to the knowledge needs of medical students and professionals especially in South Asia and South-East Asia. It also has presence in  Eastern Europe, Latin Americas and Middle Eastern Countries. Jaypee publishes open access journals in Medicine, Dental and allied health sciences and follows all ethical guidelines indicated by Committee on Publication Ethics, International Committee of Medical Journal Editors and World Association of Medical Editors. All Jaypee journals are also fully archived on Porctico for long term free access.

Overview
Founded in 1969, Jaypee-The Health Sciences Publisher publishes, books and journals in almost all the areas of health sciences.  Jaypee has more than 60 open-access journals and 4000 book titles in its active list. It publishes close to 300 new book titles each year. The company has editorial and sales offices in India, London, Panama, and 700 employees.  It publishes in 12 languages. The largest portfolio other than english is 30 Spanish titles annually from its office in Panama including 2 spanish journals.  All Jaypee English language books, videos and journals are also published digitally through its online platform.

Controversy
In 2012, a Jaypee published a textbook titled Understanding and Management of Special Child in Pediatric Dentistry which was withdrawn from sale, after it was exposed by James Heilman to contain material that had been plagiarized from a Wikipedia article. Dr. Heilman said: "We do not mind if people publish our work. They do not even have to ask our permission, and they can try to make a profit off of it. They, however, cannot claim it as their own, and they must give us just a little bit of credit."

References

External links

Book publishing companies of India
Publishing companies established in 1969
1969 establishments in Delhi